Os Deane (1890-1955) was an Australian rugby league footballer who played in the 1900s and 1910s. He played in the NSWRFL premiership for North Sydney as a utility.

Playing career
Deane began his first grade career in 1909 against Western Suburbs in a 5–5 draw.  In 1913, Deane was selected to represent New South Wales when they toured New Zealand.  Deane made 5 appearances on tour and scored two tries.

Deane was one of the club's longest serving players in the early years but his time at the club was not a successful one with the club failing to make the finals and finished last on the table twice.

Deane was the brother of Lal Deane who later became a referee and Sid Deane who represented Australia, New South Wales and was named in the North Sydney Bears team of the century.

References

North Sydney Bears players
New South Wales rugby league team players
Rugby league centres
Rugby league halfbacks
Rugby league wingers
1955 deaths
1890s births
Rugby league players from Sydney